Williams Hills is a compact group of hills, 10 nautical miles (18 km) long, located south of Childs Glacier and west of Roderick Valley in the Neptune Range, Pensacola Mountains. Mapped by United States Geological Survey (USGS) from surveys and U.S. Navy air photos, 1956–66. Named by Advisory Committee on Antarctic Names (US-ACAN) for Paul L. Williams, USGS geologist with the Neptune Range field party, 1963–64.

Features
Geographical features include:

 Mount Hobbs
 Pillow Knob
 Roderick Valley
 Teeny Rock

Hills of Queen Elizabeth Land
Pensacola Mountains